This is a list of American films released in 1923.

A

B

C

D

E

F

G

H

I

J

K

L

M

N

O

P–Q

R

S

T

U

V

W

Y–Z

Shorts

See also 
 1923 in the United States

References

External links 

 1923 films at the Internet Movie Database

1923
Film
Lists of 1923 films by country or language
1920s in American cinema